Obubra is a Local Government Area (LGA) of Cross River State, Nigeria. Its headquarters are in the town of Obubra, which is home to the Ibrahim Babangida College of Agriculture.

The National Youth Service Corps, Cross River State Orientation Camp is situated in Obubra town.

The word Obubra is derived from 'Ubibira, Ubira or Obira', the name of Obubra main village at the bank of the Cross river. Obubra however, was used to represent an administrative unit under the British colonial empire in the late 19th century. The exact history of the signed treaties of Community heads and the representatives of the British empire are in antiquity.

It covered areas bounded by Abakaliki and Ikom to the North, and Afikpo and Calabar to the South. This meant that its jurisdiction extended from parts of present-day Biase and Akamkpa local government areas through  Abi, Yakurr and Etung to  parts of Ikom and Ogoja local government areas.

Presently Obubra Local Government Area has eleven Council wards of Ababene, Ofat, Ofodua, Ovonum, Apiapum, Iyamoyong, Ochon, Obubra Urban, Ofumbongha/Yala, Osopong I and Osopong II.

Most of the communities emerged as settlements of intercommunal wars. The lines of friction which had existed from ancestral origin are heated up and the people divided by their political elites who disagree to agree on a common political leadership or a channel for socioeconomic development of Obubra Urban, wherein lies the headquarters, and then spread to all communities. Obubra has 98 villages some of which include; Apiapum, Yala, Iyamoyong, Ohana, Ochon, Isabang,  Ovunom, Ofodua, Ofat, Ababene, Oderegha, Okorogbana, Onyedama, Ebo, and Iko, Ogurude, Ofonmana, Ogurokpon, Okimbongha, Ofonagama, Omene,  Ofonamma, Ofonekom, Appiapumtet, Idoru 1 and 2, Ijutum, Eja, Ijagha Orangha, Aragharagha, Ogamina, the list continuous.

It has an area of 1,115 km and a population of 172,444 at the 2006 census.
St. Francis Xavier Parish, which today has given birth to five(5) other parishes, was originally founded in 1965. However, the first Holy Mass was celebrated in 1961, as missionaries visited to source for land for a Secondary school (St Brendan's) later located at Iyamoyong, about 15 kilometers away.  The Chiefs and opinion leaders involved in the location of St Francis Xavier were: Chief Ibingha Ogbosohu, Chief Okpa Irek Okpa, and Chief Ewona Okpa all of Obubra Village, and Chief Egbara (Kwididen Kwosopong) Clan Head.<A History of the Catholic Church in Ogoja region (1921-2021) Evolution of Parishes,institutions, Clergy, Religious and key Lay Personnel by Catholic Diocese of Ogoja>

The postal code of the area is 551.

References

Peter Obele Abue. A History of the evolution of the Catholic Church in Ogoja Region (1921-2021),Catholic Diocese of Ogoja 2021, Volume II page 30

Local Government Areas in Cross River State